The Black River Falls Public Library is located in Black River Falls, Wisconsin. It became the first free public library in Wisconsin in 1872. It was added to the National Register of Historic Places in 2007.

History

The building served as the city's library from 1915 until a new one was constructed in 1995. It was a Carnegie library. The site now houses the Jackson County Historical Society Museum.

References

Library buildings completed in 1915
Libraries on the National Register of Historic Places in Wisconsin
Carnegie libraries in Wisconsin
Historical society museums in Wisconsin
Buildings and structures in Jackson County, Wisconsin
Prairie School architecture in Wisconsin
National Register of Historic Places in Jackson County, Wisconsin